Marianne Dahlmo (born 5 January 1965) is a former Norwegian cross-country skier who competed from 1985 to 1994. She won a silver medal in the 4 × 5 km relay at the 1988 Winter Olympics in Calgary and also finished 8th in the 20 km event in those same games.

Dahlmo also won two medals in the 4 × 5 km relay FIS Nordic World Ski Championships (silver: 1987, bronze: 1989). She also finished fifth in the 10 km in 1987 and fifth again in the 5 km in 1991. She also won four World Cup Events during the late 1980s as well.

She represented the club Bodø & Omegn IF.

Cross-country skiing results
All results are sourced from the International Ski Federation (FIS).

Olympic Games
 1 medal – (1 silver)

World Championships
 2 medals – (1 silver, 1 bronze)

World Cup

Season standings

Individual podiums
4 victories 
12 podiums

Team podiums

 3 victories  
 9 podiums  

Note:   Until the 1999 World Championships and the 1994 Olympics, World Championship and Olympic races were included in the World Cup scoring system.

References

External links
 
 
 

1965 births
Living people
Norwegian female cross-country skiers
Olympic cross-country skiers of Norway
Olympic silver medalists for Norway
Cross-country skiers at the 1988 Winter Olympics
Olympic medalists in cross-country skiing
FIS Nordic World Ski Championships medalists in cross-country skiing
Sportspeople from Bodø
Medalists at the 1988 Winter Olympics